Anerastia dubia is a species of snout moth in the genus Anerastia. It was described by Aleksey Maksimovich Gerasimov in 1929. It is found in Hungary.

References

Moths described in 1929
Anerastiini
Endemic fauna of Hungary
Moths of Europe